Michael McCann is the name of:
 Michael McCann (composer) (born 1976), film, television, and game composer
 Michael McCann (field hockey) (born 1977), field hockey striker from Australia
 Michael McCann (politician) (born 1964), British MP
 Michael McCann (sports law) (born 1976), professor at University of New Hampshire School of Law; commentator at NBA TV and Sports Illustrated
 Michael J. McCann, Canadian author of crime and supernatural fiction
 E. Michael McCann (born 1936), District Attorney of Milwaukee County in Wisconsin, 1968–2006
 Mickey McCann, Irish hurler